This is a list of all men, boys and women who have captained the West Indies cricket team at official international level in at least one match. The West Indies became a full member of the Imperial Cricket Conference (now the International Cricket Council) on 31 May 1926 at the same time as India and New Zealand. It played its first test match in 1928 against England at Lord's. Their first game against other opposition came in 1930/31 when they played Australia.

In the mid-1980s there were two rebel West Indian tours to South Africa, which was at that time banned from official competition because of the apartheid régime then in force there. None of the matches from the rebel tours were recognised as official Test matches and all players who toured South Africa at the time were banned from official international cricket matches for life. The captains of those West Indies sides are listed below.

Prior to becoming a member of the ICC, the first combined West Indies team was formed in 1884 and toured Canada and the United States in 1886 under the captaincies of Charles Guy Austin Wyatt of Demerara and Laurence Fyfe of Jamaica (also vice captain under Wyatt). In a return tour by the United States in 1888, the combined West Indian team was captained by Edward Wright. Combined West Indian teams have played more regular first-class cricket under the name "West Indies" since 1897 usually against amateur sides touring from England, such as Lord Brackley's XI or RA Bennett's XI, but from 1912 onwards the MCC also played on tour against the West Indies. The West Indies also toured England in 1900, 1906 and 1923 with the opposition usually being various English first-class and minor county sides. Other opposition during these tours included amateur sides, the MCC, an England XI (once) and Scotland and Ireland (once each). Some of the matches played on the various West Indies tours of England were deemed not to be first-class matches. During this time (1897 to 1926) the various West Indies captains were Aucher Warner, Stanley Sproston (non-first-class matches only), Harold Austin, Clement King, Alfred Harrigan, Edwin Moulder, William Sherlock, Percy Tarilton, Malcolm Austin and Karl Nunes

Men's cricket

Test match captains

This is a list of cricketers who have captained the West Indian cricket team for at least one Test match. Development of the Test captaincy of West Indies falls into three eras –
The period of white captaincy 
Rise to become the dominant Test nation
Slide from Test domination.
The table of results is complete up to the second and final Test match for the West Indies in the 2022-23 West Indian tour of South Africa. Where a player has a dagger (†) next to a Test match series in which he captained at least one Test, that denotes that player deputised for the appointed captain or were appointed for a minor proportion in a series.

Notes:
1 Jackie and Rolph Grant were brothers
2 Includes one tie
3 Garfield Sobers also captained the Rest of the World team in England in 1970 and in Australia in 1971/2. These series were arranged to replace planned tours of those countries by South Africa, which were cancelled because of the apartheid policies followed by the South African government of the time.

Men's ODI captains

This is a complete list of every man who has captained the West Indies in at least one One Day International. It is complete up to second match for the West Indies in the 2022-23 West Indian tour of South Africa.

Men's Twenty20 International captains

This is a complete list of every man who has captained the West Indies in at least one twenty20 international. It is complete up to the third and final T20I match for the West Indies in the 2022 T20 World Cup.

The first Twenty20 International involving West Indies was played in February 2006 against New Zealand in Auckland. This match was the first tied Twenty20 International and also involved the first bowl-out (won by New Zealand).

Two years later in December 2008, another match between New Zealand and West Indies at the same venue in Auckland was also tied and this match involved the first elimination over/Super Over (won by West Indies) which is meant to replace the bowl-out.

The first Twenty20 International played in the West Indies was played on 20 June 2008 against Australia in Bridgetown, Barbados.

Other men's captains

In addition to the above official Tests and ODIs, there have been West Indian captains of other leading sides. The Rest of the World teams that played in England and Australia in 1970 and 1971/2 respectively were captained by a West Indian. World Series Cricket featured a West Indian side, and finally, there were two rebel West Indian tours to apartheid South Africa.

Rest of the World, 1970 and 1971/2

When the South African tour to England due to take place in 1970 was cancelled, five matches were arranged against a Rest of the World team, all of which were recognised as Tests at the time, although they were later stripped of Test status. A similar situation also arose with the proposed South African tour of Australia that was due to take place in 1971/2, when the Rest of the World team also played two one-day matches. (There were to be three games, but one was abandoned without a ball being bowled.) These matches do not have official ODI status. The Rest of the World team was captained by a West Indian, Garfield Sobers.

World Series Cricket, 1977/8 to 1978/9

In 1977/8 Kerry Packer financed a breakaway cricket movement by signing up top players from Australia, the West Indies and other cricket nations around the world. Three sides were constructed: an Australian team, a West Indian team and a World team, with the World teams including some West Indians too. The teams played a mixture of unofficial Test matches, styled as Supertests, and unofficial ODIs. Unlike the Australian players, who were barred from playing official cricket until the rift was healed after the 1978/9 season, the West Indian players were permitted to play official cricket as well as compete in World Series Cricket.

Rebel tour to South Africa, 1982/3 and 1983/4

In 1982/3 and 1983/4 a group of West Indian cricketers toured apartheid South Africa. The West Indies Cricket Board banned all the tourists from cricket for life, and such was the furore caused by the visits that many of the cricketers ceased to be welcome in their home islands. The rebel West Indian squad played a series of Tests and ODIs, none of which have official status.

Women's cricket

Test match captains

This is a list of cricketers who have captained the West Indian women's cricket team for at least one women's Test match. The table of results is complete to the Test against Pakistan in 2003/4.

Women's One-Day International captains

This is a list of cricketers who have captained the West Indian women's cricket team for at least one women's one-day international. The table of results is complete to the third and final match for the team in the 2022-23 England women's tour of the West Indies.

Notes

1 West Indies women won the One Over Eliminator against South Africa women in the fifth WODI of the 2021 South Africa women's tour of the West Indies
2 West Indies women won the One Over Eliminator against South Africa women in the second WODI of the 2021-22 West Indies women's tour of South Africa

Women's Twenty20 International captains

This is a complete list of every woman who has captained the West Indies in at least one twenty20 international. It is complete up to the fourth and final match for the team in the 2023 ICC Women's T20 World Cup. In 2010 West Indies women took their first international T20 title by winning the 2010 ICC Women's Cricket Challenge. The first Twenty20 International involving West Indies women was played in June 2008 against Ireland in Dublin.

Notes:
1 Also captained two warm-up matches against Pakistan and Sri Lanka which were both won by West Indies.
2 After the 2010 Sri Lanka women's tour to the West Indies, Pakistan played an apparently unofficial 3-match series in preparation for the Women's World Twenty20. Aguilleira captained WI women entirely in this series which WI women won 2–1. This was followed by two official warm-up matches (in which Aguilleira also captained WI women), one against Pakistan women again (won by Pakistan) and one against New Zealand women (won by West Indies women).
3 West Indies won the Super Over in this match by 3 runs with WI scoring 10/1 and Pakistan scoring 7/1
4 West Indies won the One Over Eliminator in this match with England scoring 6/1 and West Indies replying with 9/0
5 New Zealand won the One Over Eliminator in this match with West Indies scoring 5/2 and New Zealand replying with 8/0
6 West Indies won the One Over Eliminator in this match with Pakistan scoring 3/2 and West Indies replying with 6/1
7 West Indies won the One Over Eliminator in this match with West Indies scoring 18/0 and Pakistan replying with 1/2

Youth cricket

Youth Test match captains

This is a list of cricketers who have captained the West Indian U-19 cricket team for at least one under-19 Test match. The table of results is complete to the only youth Test match of the 2011 Dubai Series between the West Indies U-19 team and the Australia U-19 team and includes the third Test against England in 2001.

Youth One-Day International captains

This is a list of cricketers who have captained the West Indian U-19 cricket team for at least one U-19 One Day International. The table of results is complete to the sixth and final youth ODI match for the WI U-19 in the 2022 ICC Under-19 Cricket World Cup, and includes all six youth ODI match for the WI U-19 in the 2021 West Indies Under-19 tour of England, all six youth ODI match for the WI U-19 team in the 2020 Under-19 Cricket World Cup, all six youth ODI match for the WI U-19 team in the 2019 Under-19 Tri-Nation Tournament in the West Indies, all six youth ODI matches for the WI U-19 team in 2018 Under-19 Cricket World Cup, all three youth ODI match for the WI U-19 team in the 2017 West Indies Under-19 tour of Zimbabwe, all five matches for the WI U-19 team in the 2017 West Indies Under-19 tour of South Africa, all six matches for the WI U-19 team of the 2016 U-19 Cricket World Cup, all three matches for the WI U-19 team of 2015/2016 West Indies U-19 tour of Bangladesh, all six matches for the WI U-19 team of the 2014 U-19 Cricket World Cup, the one and only youth ODI match of the 2013/2014 West Indies U-19 tour of Bangladesh (the other six matches were cancelled following an explosion near the WI U-19 team hotel), all seven youth ODI matches of the 2013/2014 Bangladesh U-19 tour of the West Indies, the 2012 U-19 Cricket World Cup (all six matches including the fifth place playoff), all seven youth ODI matches for the West Indies U-19 team in the 2011/12 U-19 Quadrangular Series in India, all three youth ODI matches of the 2011 Dubai Series between the West Indies U-19 team and the Australia U-19 team and all six matches of the West Indies team in the 2009/10 U-19 Cricket World Cup where they lost in the semi-finals to the Pakistan U-19 cricket team but beat the Sri Lanka U-19 cricket team in the playoff to place third in the tournament. West Indies U-19s' best result in an U-19 World Cup has been as champions in 2016. Previously they were a finalist in 2003/04 and 2007/08 they won the plate final for the U-19 World Cup.

Youth Women's Twenty20 International captains

This is a list of cricketers who have captained the West Indies women's under-19 cricket team for at least one U-19 Twenty20 International. The table of results is complete to the fifth and final youth ODI match for the WI women's U-19 in the 2023 ICC Under-19 Women's T20 World Cup where the team advanced to the Super 6 stage before being eliminated.

Most successful captains

The West Indian team's greatest successes in One Day Internationals came in 1975 and 1979, when they won the Cricket World Cup under the captaincy of Clive Lloyd, and in 2004 when they won the ICC Champions Trophy under the captaincy of Brian Lara. The West Indies' most successful captains in Test cricket are Viv Richards (who has won 27 of his 50 Tests), Clive Lloyd (who won 36 of his 74 Tests), Frank Worrell (who won 9 of his 15 Tests) and Richie Richardson (who won 11 of his 24 Tests). In one-day internationals the West Indies' most successful captain is Clive Lloyd, who won 64 of his 84 matches. The successes of the senior men's team in international tournaments was never replicated at the youth level until the 2016 U-19 Cricket World Cup when Shimron Hetmyer lead the West Indies Under-19 team to their first ICC Under-19 Cricket World Cup title. For the most recent international format of cricket, Twenty20 Internationals, the West Indies' best result in an international tournament was achieved in the 2012 ICC World Twenty20 and 2016 ICC World Twenty20 where the team won the ICC World Twenty20 under the captaincy of Darren Sammy. 	Stafanie Taylor led the West Indies' women's team to their best result in an international Twenty20 tournament when the team won the 2016 ICC Women's World Twenty20. Prior to that Merissa Aguilleira led West Indies women to the semi-finals in the 2010 ICC Women's World Twenty20, the 2012 ICC Women's World Twenty20 and the 2014 ICC Women's World Twenty20 and also led the women to their first title in an international Women's Twenty20 tournament during the 2010 ICC Women's Cricket Challenge. Both the West Indies' men's and women's teams made it to the semi-finals of the 2012 ICC World Twenty20 and 2012 ICC Women's World Twenty20 under the captaincies of Darren Sammy and Merissa Aguilleira respectively; the third time the men's and women's teams from the same country have done this in the ICC World Twenty20 after Australia's men and women's teams achieved the feat in 2010 and 2012. This feat was repeated for the 2014 ICC World Twenty20 and 2014 ICC Women's World Twenty20 when the West Indies' men's and women's teams made it to the semi-finals again under the captaincies of Darren Sammy and Merissa Aguillera. This was bettered in 2016 when both the West Indies' men's and women's teams not only made it to the semi-finals but won the tournaments for the 2016 ICC World Twenty20 and 2016 ICC Women's World Twenty20 under the captaincies of Darren Sammy and Stafanie Taylor. Along with men and women's teams from New Zealand (in 2016), England (2016), South Africa (2014), and Australia (2012 and 2010) who also made it the semi-finals in the previous tournaments, this was the eighth time men's and women's teams from the same country have reached the semi-finals in the same year of the ICC World Twenty20. It was also only the second time (after Australia in 2010) that men's and women's teams from the same country have reached the final in the same year of the ICC's premier Twenty20 tournaments. Merissa Aguilleira also led the West Indies women to its best result in Women's ODI cricket when the team finished second in the 2013 Women's Cricket World Cup (bettering their previous best finish in the Women's World Cup of fifth place in 2005). Their previous best result had been under Stephanie Power when she led the West Indies to second place in the 2003 IWCC Trophy. Aguilleira is also the most successful West Indies women's captain in one-day internationals, winning 32 of 55 matches. The only women's captain who has led her side to a victory in a women's Test match is Louise Browne in the 1976/77 Test series against India.

See also
List of West Indian Test cricketers
List of West Indian ODI cricketers
Development of the Test captaincy of West Indies

References

Cricket Archive
Wisden Cricketers' Almanack

Captains
West Indies
National